Lithuania Practical Shooting Sport Federation, Lithuanian Lietuvos Praktinio Saudymo Sporto Federacija, is the Lithuanian association for practical shooting under the International Practical Shooting Confederation.

External links 
 Official homepage of Lithuania Practical Shooting Sport Federation

References 

Regions of the International Practical Shooting Confederation
Sports organizations of Lithuania
Sports organizations established in 1998
1998 establishments in Lithuania